Gelechia flavipalpella is a moth of the family Gelechiidae. It is found in the Democratic Republic of Congo and South Africa.

The wingspan is about 17 mm. The forewings are fuscous with a purplish tinge and with an almost obsolete darker fuscous spot beyond the end of the cell. The hindwings are cinereous.

References

Moths described in 1881
Gelechia